DJ Timmy Regisford is an American DJ and producer. After working at the WBLS radio station in New York and as an A&R Director at Atlantic Records and MCA Records, he became Vice President of A&R at Motown Records, then Vice President of A&R at Dreamworks Records. He was the founder and resident DJ at the Club Shelter nights in New York City.

Career 
Regisford start deejaying in his teen years.

In 1981, he started his music production career by collaborating with Boyd Jarvis, who had a Yamaha CS-15 synthesizer. Regisford heard Jarvis play dubs over some local DJs at a club and asked Jarvis to collaborate with him. Soon they were making music at Regisford's place with the addition of a drum machine and reel to real and got some remix jobs, which also led to Jarvis getting a record deal.

He also hosted a radio show, Saturday Night Dance Party, on New York's WBLS with Jarvis.

In 1985, Regisford started his own record label, called Movin' Records, which quickly became one of the most important house music labels in the world. In 1991, he founded and started a residency at the infamous Shelter nightclub in NYC, where he became known for his long and soulful sets that blended elements of house, disco, funk, and R&B.

In 1988, Regisford began working as an A&R executive and producer for some of the biggest record labels of the time, including Atlantic Records and MCA Records. He produced and remixed tracks for artists such as Diana Ross, Stevie Wonder and Bobby Womack, and helped to introduce the world to the sound of house music.

Over the years, Regisford has continued to work as a DJ, producer, and remixer, collaborating with some of the biggest names in music, such as Sade, Madonna, and Chaka Khan. He has also released several albums and mixtapes.

Regisford is widely regarded as a pioneer of the house music genre, and has been inducted into the Dance Music Hall of Fame. He continues to tour the world.

Discography

Battle of the Beats (1985 EP)
Movement''' (2006 Single)Africa Calling (2007 Single)At Night/Loving Arms (2007 Single)Body/Poem (2007 Single)Naive Track (2007 Single)The Radical Track (2007 Single)Hard Drums (2008 Single)Ryan's Theme (2008 Single)The Bubble Track (2008 Single)Track for Downtown 161 (2008 Single)Hold (2009 Single)Kala Boo/La Vern Abainana (2009 Single)Tension (2009)Umoya (2013)Branded Shelter (2015) Japan7pm'' (2019)

References

External links
 discogs.com Timmy Regisford
 genius.com Timmy-regisford
 Timmy Regisford: Up Close and Personal

American electronic musicians
American house musicians
American DJs
Musicians from New York City
Year of birth missing (living people)
Living people
Electronic dance music DJs